The Journal of Personality is a bimonthly peer-reviewed academic journal covering personality psychology. It is published by Wiley-Blackwell and the editor-in-chief is Howard Tennen (University of Connecticut). The journal covers research on personality, particularly on personality and behavior dynamics, personality development, and cognitive, affective, and interpersonal individual differences. According to the Journal Citation Reports, the journal has a 2020  impact factor of 5.117.

The journal began in 1932 as Character and Personality.  It took on its current name in 1945.

References

External links 
 

Bimonthly journals
Differential psychology journals
English-language journals
Personality journals
Publications established in 1932
Wiley-Blackwell academic journals